Casa Grondona is a historic building located on Corso Italia #47 in central Milan, Italy.

History 
The palace was commissioned by Felice Grondona, a wealthy industrialist, who employed the architect Enrico Terzaghi. The palace was completed in 1876 in a sober Neo-Renaissance style.

Description
The ground floor is made from rectangular blocks of stone; it has protruding porticos supporting three balconies. An interlaced frieze separates the ground and first floor. The facade has little decoration, consisting of repeated lion face masks in roundels and on the brackets supporting the roof.

References
 
 Entry roughly translated from Italian wikipedia.

Grondona